Hayatabad-e Khalifeh (also Romanized as Ḩayātābād-e Khalīfeh) is a village in Tashan-e Sharqi Rural District, Tashan District, Behbahan County, Khuzestan Province, Iran. At the 2006 census, its population was 115, in 23 families.

References 

Populated places in Behbahan County